End Water Poverty is an international campaign calling for sanitation and potable water for everyone. UN figures show that worldwide, 2.6 billion people live without anywhere to excrete in a sanitary manner and over 1.2 billion people lack safe water to drink. Over 4,900 children die every day from preventable water-related diseases, and 2 million children die yearly from lack of safe water and sanitation.

The coalition members consist mainly of non-governmental organisations from around the world who recognise sanitation and water's vital role in tackling poverty and creating sustainable development.

The campaign was launched on World Water Day, March 22, 2007 and in its first year 25,000 supporters called on Chancellor Merkel of Germany, as the G8 summit host, to commit the G8 countries to a plan to provide sanitation and water for all. Disappointed by the outcome, they then looked towards Japan.

Member organizations

 Action Against Hunger
 WASH United
 Oxfam
 WaterAid
 Initiative: Eau
 IRC (WASH)

External links
End Water Poverty website

Protest marches
Protests in the United Kingdom
Water and the environment